Karen Elizabeth Boyle (born 22 October 1971), is Professor of Feminist Media Studies at the University of Strathclyde, previously she was professor of Feminist Studies at the University of Stirling, and before that was a lecturer in film and television studies at the University of Glasgow. She has published a number of articles on feminism, violence and pornography.

Boyle sits on the editorial boards of both Feminist Media Studies, and Sexualization, Media, and Society.

Bibliography

Books

Chapters in books

Journal articles 
 
 
 
See also the film: Natural Born Killers.
 
See also: Christine and Léa Papin and the film Sister My Sister.
 
Review of Linda Williams' book, Porn Studies.
 
 
  Pdf.
 
 
 
 
See also: 
  Pdf.
 
 
 
Article refers to:

Other 
 
  Pdf. (Catalogue of resources.)
 
Book review of:

References

External links 
 Profile page: Karen Boyle University of Stirling

1972 births
Academics of the University of Glasgow
Academics of the University of Stirling
Anti-pornography feminists
British feminist writers
British mass media scholars
British women academics
Feminist studies scholars
Media studies writers
Nonviolence advocates
Living people